Stefan Adamsson (born 3 January 1978) is a Swedish former cyclist.

Major results

1999
 1st Stage 2 Tour de Serbie
2000
 1st  National Road Race Championships
 2nd Under–23 Time trial, European Road Championships
 1st Scandinavian Race Uppsala
 2nd Paris–Tours Espoirs
 9th Under–23 Road race, World Road Championships
2002
 1st  National Road Race Championships
2004
 4th Grand Prix de Fourmies
 10th Ronde van Drenthe
2003
 8th Overall Circuit Franco-Belge
2005
 3rd National Time Trial Championships
 3rd National Road Race Championships
 5th Grand Prix de Denain
 8th Overall GP Costa Azul
2006
 2nd Overall International Cycling Classic

References

Swedish male cyclists
1978 births
Living people
People from Skövde Municipality
Sportspeople from Västra Götaland County